Coldblow is a village in South East London within the London Borough of Bexley. It is located south east of Bexleyheath and south west of Dartford, adjacent to the Greater London boundary with the county of Kent.

Transport

Buses
429 to Dartford via Wilmington or to West Kingsdown via Joydens Wood, Swanley & Farningham. Mondays to Saturdays only. Operated by Go-Coach.
B12 to Erith via Bexley, Bexleyheath & Northumberland Heath or to Joydens Wood. Operated by Go Ahead London for London Buses.

Rail
The nearest National Rail station to Coldblow is Bexley.

Areas of London
Districts of the London Borough of Bexley